Carleton was a provincial electoral district for the Legislative Assembly of New Brunswick, Canada.

This district contained most of northern portions of Carleton.  It was created in the 1994 electoral redistribution out of Carleton North and most of Carleton Centre.  It was considered one of the safest seats in the province for the Progressive Conservatives, having elected a representative of that party since its creation, including in the 1995 election when the PCs won only 6 of 55 seats.

The district was slightly altered in the 2006 redistribution when it lost small amounts of territory to the Victoria-Tobique district.

The district was abolished in the 2013 redistribution.  However, a new substantially different district named Carleton was created using less than half of its population and a majority of the population of the old Woodstock district.

It was held by Dale Graham of the New Brunswick Progressive Conservative Party since its creation.

Members of the Legislative Assembly

Election results

Former district

A multi-member district, which was also considered a conservative stronghold, existed here prior to 1973.  For more information on this district, see Carleton (1834-1974 electoral district).

References

External links 
Website of the Legislative Assembly of New Brunswick

Former provincial electoral districts of New Brunswick